Route 103 is a  west–east state highway in southeastern Massachusetts. Its western terminus is a continuation of Rhode Island Route 103 in Warren, Rhode Island and its eastern terminus is at U.S. Route 6 (US 6) and Route 138 in Somerset.

Route description

Massachusetts Route 103 is a continuation of R.I. Route 103.  It begins in Swansea at the Warren line, heading eastward as Wilbur Avenue.  It crosses the Cole River before entering the village of Ocean Grove.  As the route enters Somerset it crosses the Lees River, just east of its junction with Exit 4 of I-195.  (Part of the exit structure is linked to Lees River Avenue, which ends at Route 103 just west of the rest of the exit.)  From there it continues eastward, north of Brayton Point and the Dominion Resources power station before Wilbur Avenue turns northward, intersecting with Riverside Avenue at the end of Brayton Avenue, where all three roads formerly met the Slade's Ferry Bridge.  Route 103 then continues northward along Riverside Avenue to its end at intersection with the former alignment of U.S. Route 6 and Route 138 just west of the former Brightman Street Bridge, before US Route 6's realignment to the new Veteran's Memorial Bridge.  Route 138 continues northward along Riverside Avenue from the new bridge, creating a gap between the end of 103 and the northward curve of 138.  

Before the removal of the Slade's Ferry Bridge, Route 103 traveled along that bridge, and ended in Fall River where Routes 6 and 138 meet.

Major intersections

References

Neilbert.com Massachusetts Route Log

External links

Mass. Rt. 103 endpoint photos

103
Transportation in Bristol County, Massachusetts